This is a list of estimates of the real gross domestic product growth rate (not rebased GDP) in Asian states for the latest years recorded in the CIA World Factbook. All sovereign states with United Nations membership and territory in Asia are included on the list apart from those who are also members of the Council of Europe. In addition, the list includes the special administrative regions of China (Hong Kong and Macao) and Taiwan. Dependent territories of non-Asian states are excluded.

List

Regions

See also
 Economic growth
 GDP

References

Growth, Asia

GDP growth